The William & Mary Tribe is a moniker for the College of William & Mary's athletic teams and the university's community more broadly.

William & Mary has won two team national championships (both in men's tennis), the AIAW championships in women's golf, the NAIA championships in women's gymnastics, thirteen USA Gymnastics Collegiate Championships, and various individual national championships. The College has more conference championships than any other school in the Colonial Athletic Association. As of the end of the 2010–11 academic year, the Tribe had won 101 conference championships. Dating back to the athletic program's beginning, there have been about 160 conference titles in all.

William & Mary is the second-oldest university in the United States. Since the founding of its athletic program in 1893 the school's athletes have worn different colors and nicknames.  From 1893 to 1909 William & Mary football players were known simply as the Orange and White; this reflected the official school colors at that time. From 1910 to 1916 the team colors changed, and the new nickname, "The Orange and Black", reflected this. From 1916 to the mid-1980s William & Mary athletic teams were known as the Indians. Since 1978 the school's teams have been known simply as the Tribe. During the 2006–07 school year then–College President Gene Nichol removed two tribal feathers from the William & Mary athletic logo to bring the program into compliance with newly passed NCAA regulations. On April 6, 2010, after student discussion and subsequent polling, the griffin was announced as the school's new mascot.

In September 2020, William & Mary announced it would discontinue seven sports men's indoor and outdoor track and field, men's and women's swimming, men's and women's gymnastics, and women's volleyball at the conclusion of the 2020–21 academic year. After a considerable amount of backlash and controversy, Samantha Huge resigned as athletic director on October 6, 2020. Jeremy Martin was named interim athletic director.

The three women's sports that had been cut were completely reinstated on October 19, 2020. Then on November 5, 2020, the four men's sports that had been cut were reinstated through the 2021–22 school year, and possibly beyond after a more thorough review.

Sports sponsored

Baseball 

In the 1960s Joe Plumeri, future Chairman & CEO of Willis Group Holdings and owner of the Trenton Thunder, who later donated $2 million to build the team's Plumeri Park, played on the baseball team as a second baseman and outfielder. Plumeri also funded the Joseph J. Plumeri Endowment Fund for baseball scholarships for the school.  The baseball team has qualified for the NCAA Division I Baseball Championship in 1983, 2001, 2013 and 2016, with the most recent appearance including an upset of the Tribe's rival (and defending College World Series champion) Virginia Cavaliers.

Football 

The football team has won eight conference championships. While a member of the Southern Conference, W&M were champions or co-champions in 1942, 1947, 1966, and 1970. The William & Mary scandal of 1951, which involved improper alteration of athletic recruit transcripts, brought disfavorable national attention and effectively resulted in the College downgrading football going forward as the faculty revolted and it was not invited to join the Atlantic Coast Conference when that league was established in 1953.

In the 1960s, future Willis Group Holdings Chairman & CEO Joe Plumeri played on the football team on scholarship as a halfback for Lou Holtz.  After joining the Yankee Conference, the Tribe won the Mid-Atlantic Division in 1993 and won the conference championship in 1996. After the Yankee Conference's 1997 merger with the A-10 Conference, the Tribe were co-champions in 2001 and 2004. After the Colonial Athletic Association began sponsoring football with the 2007 season, the Tribe were co-champions in 2010 and in 2015.

The 2004 season saw William & Mary reach the Division I-AA national semi-finals before finally falling to rival James Madison University.

In 2008, the Tribe played Richmond, at home, on the very last game of the season. While Richmond was assured of a berth in the playoffs, having played and won an extra game due to a 12-game schedule that year (Tribe only played 11 games), the Tribe entered the game needing a win to secure a playoff spot. William & Mary trailed by 14 points going into the 4th quarter but made a huge comeback (largely due to Derek Cox) to send the game into overtime. The Tribe lost in overtime after Richmond blocked a field goal attempt during the Tribe's possession, then kicked a successful field goal during its possession. By failing to beat the Spiders William & Mary missed the playoffs. Richmond, however, would go on to win the NCAA Division I Football Championship by defeating Eastern Kentucky, Appalachian State, Northern Iowa, and the University of Montana 24–7 in the national championship game in Chattanooga, Tennessee.

In 2009, the Tribe played the Virginia Cavaliers (UVa), in a season opening match-up for both schools in Charlottesville for the first time since 1986. The Tribe upset Virginia 26–14. It was the second Tribe win over Virginia in as many tries and mirrored several other recent wins by CAA (FCS) programs over those in the ACC (FBS), including three by Richmond over Duke (2006, 2009, 2011).  The Tribe finished the year 11–3, after a run to the national semifinals that ended with a 14–13 loss to CAA rival and eventual champion Villanova.

Basketball

Men 

Traditionally, the Tribe has not been a storied basketball program, though they have achieved sporadic success. Their only postseason berths ever were the 1983 National Invitation Tournament after winning the regular season conference title and the 2010 National Invitation Tournament after beating both Wake Forest University and the University of Maryland on the road during the regular season. The Tribe qualified for the 2015 National Invitation Tournament after winning their first ever CAA regular season title.

They have appeared in nine conference tournament finals. While in the Southern Conference they lost the tournament final in 1958, 1961, 1965, and 1975, and while in the ECAC South (precursor to the Colonial Athletic Association) they lost the 1983 final to James Madison, 38–41. Their most recent CAA tournament final appearances came in 2008 (L, 59–68 vs. George Mason), 2010 (L, 53–60 vs. Old Dominion), 2014 (L, 74–75 vs. Delaware), and 2015 (L, 61–72 vs. Northeastern).

Women 

The Tribe women's basketball team has generally not been a successful program. Their only conference tournament final appearance to date was in the 1993 CAA final, which they lost to perennial power Old Dominion, 51–65. The 2014–15 season was their most successful in many years and resulted in a bid to the 2015 Women's Basketball Invitational.

Cross country, track & field 
The College of William & Mary's most dominant sports are its men's and women's cross country and track & field teams. The cross country teams host their home meets on the grounds of the Eastern State Hospital. Home track meets are held at the newly renovated Zable Stadium. However, the university's 2014 master plan called for relocating the track to a new facility adjacent to Albert–Daly Field and Plumeri Park. The totals below are current as of the end of the 2014–15 season.

Men 
The men's cross country team qualified for fourteen straight NCAA Division I championships (1997–2010), and 26 total NCAA championship appearances. Alumnus Brian Hyde represented the United States in the 1996 Olympics.  In November 2009, the Tribe placed 5th at the Division 1 NCAA Men's Cross Country Championship in Terre Haute, Indiana.

William & Mary hosted the men's cross country championship at Eastern State Hospital in 1970.

Total conference championships:
Cross Country – 38 (23 CAA, 15 Southern)
Track & Field – 32 championships in 21 separate years

NCAA championship team appearances:

1963 – 17th
1964 – 20th
1966 – 20th
1984 – 15th
1970 – 10th
1971 – 17th
1972 – 11th
1973 – 4th
1975 – 23rd
1990 – 15th
1994 – 18th
1995 – 17th
1997 – 9th
1998 – 13th
1999 – 13th
2000 – 10th
2001 – 16th
2002 – 14th
2003 – 31st
2004 – DNF
2005 – 22nd
2006 – 8th
2007 – 15th
2008 – 16th
2009 – 5th
2010 – 19th

NCAA individual championships:
1969-70: Hal Michael, indoor mile
1973-74: Reggie Clark, indoor 880 yards

Women 
The women's cross country squad has made nine NCAA championship appearances, most recently in 2014 when they won their first-ever NCAA Regional title.

Total conference championships:
Cross Country – 21
Track & Field – 11

NCAA championship team appearances:

1990 – 20th (tie)
1992 – 16th
1996 – 17th
1998 – 10th
2002 – 23rd (tie)
2005 – 22nd
2012 – 21st
2013 – 12th
2014 – 17th

AIAW individual championships:
1982: Jeri Daniels, (outdoor) shot put

Soccer

Men 

The Tribe men's soccer team has produced two First Team All-Americans and fourteen NCAA Tournament appearances, most recently in 2010. They have won eight conference tournaments since the program's inception in 1965. The most famous alumnus from this program is TV pundit Jon Stewart. He played from 1981–1983 and scored the lone goal in a 1–0 victory over UConn in the 1983 ECAC tournament championship to give William & Mary their second ever conference tournament championship crown. Stewart ended his career with 10 goals and 12 assists while playing as a midfielder and winger.

The majority of the Tribe's success in men's soccer was overseen by Al Albert during an illustrious 33-year career as head coach.  In 2004, Albert passed the coaching reins to his capable protege, Chris Norris.  Norris was a player and assistant coach at W&M for 13 years before becoming Albert's successor in Williamsburg.

Women 

When counting all-time women's soccer NCAA Tournament appearances, just behind national powerhouses North Carolina (with 30) and UConn (with 28)  are the William & Mary Tribe (24). As of the end of 2011, they were on an NCAA-record 30-year consecutive winning seasons streak (tied with North Carolina), dating back to 1982, capturing ten conference tournament crowns in that span. Twice players were selected as the NSCAA National Player of the Year (1987, 1995), and three times the team has made it all the way to the Tournament's Elite 8 (1987, 1994, 1997).

Field hockey 

The field hockey team plays at Busch Field on campus. The team has one CAA championship (2018) and has qualified for three NCAA tournaments, with a combined record of 1–3.

NCAA Tournament performances

Gymnastics 
The men's and women's gymnastics teams host their meets at William & Mary Hall.

Men 
The men's team has been very successful across the years. While never winning a team national title, the team has achieved two individual championships: Scott McCall on the rings in 1996 and Ramon Jackson on the parallel bars in 2004. The team has appeared at five NCAA championship events: 2002, 2003, 2005, 2006, and 2008. Tribe men's gymnastics has also won thirteen USA Gymnastics Collegiate Championships (1994, 1995, 1996, 1997, 1999, 2001, 2002, 2003, 2004, 2005, 2006, 2007, and 2009) and produced five CGCA National Academic Team Champions. Additionally, they are members of the Eastern Intercollegiate Gymnastics League. The Tribe has a total of four ECAC gymnastics titles, 1992, 1994, 2006, and 2014.

Women 
The women's team, on the other hand, has never qualified for the national championship meet or won an individual event. Nonetheless, the women's team has still won six ECAC gymnastics championships: 1999, 2001, 2002, 2003, 2014 & 2015. They also won an NAIA gymnastics title in 1983.

Golf 

Both the men's and women's golf teams host their home tournaments at the River Course at the Kingsmill Resort. Neither the men nor women have ever qualified as a team for the NCAA golf championships. However, the women's team won an AIAW championship in 1981. In conference play, the men's team won their sole CAA championship in 1985.

Lacrosse 
The women's lacrosse team plays at Busch Field. They have qualified for seven NCAA tournaments and have a combined record of 0–7. They also have one CAA title, from 1992.

NCAA performances

Swimming and diving 
The men's and women's teams compete at the Student Recreation Center. Previously, they swam at the Adair Gymnasium.

Men 
The men's teams has competed at several NCAA championships, 1938, 1963, 1985 and 1986, but has not yet won a team or individual national championship. The team has won six consecutive CAA championships: 2015, 2016, 2017, 2018, 2019, and 2020.

NCAA Qualifiers

Diver Shawn McLane was named an All-American in 1985 (1- and 3-meter) and 1986 (3-meter). Swimmer Colin Wright was named an All-American in 2020, having been seeded fourth in the 50 yard freestyle and eighth in the 100 yard freestyle at the 2020 NCAA championships that were cancelled due to the 2020 SARS-CoV-2 pandemic. Wright also earned a 12th place finish at the 2019 Phillips 66 National Championships in the 50 LCM freestyle.

The men won every CAA Championship Meet relay for the three-straight years from 2018 to 2020, and won all five of them with conference records in 2020.  As of 2020, they also held 9 of the 13 individual CAA Records.

The team has 6 qualifying times for the 2021 Olympic Trial Qualifier Meet:  Jack Doherty-50 Freestyle and 100 Butterfly, Ben Skopic-200 Individual Medley, Ian Thompson-50 Freestyle and Colin Wright-50 & 100 Freestyle.

Women 
The women's team has been represented at the NCAA Championship meet on five occasions. Erin Sheehey competed at the meet in 1984 and Katie Radloff qualified and competed all four years of her college career from 2007 to 2010, finishing as high as 20th in the nation in the 100 yard freestyle. The women have also won three CAA championships: 2007, 2016, and 2017.

Missy Cundiff '22 has a qualifying time in the 50 Freestyle to attend the 2021 Olympic Qualifier Meet.

Tennis 
The men's and women's tennis teams play at the Millie West Tennis Facility and the McCormack–Nagelsen Tennis Center. Both teams (as of 2015) are the defending CAA tennis champions.

Men 
The men's team won two NCAA championships in 1947 (10–4 vs. Rice) and 1948 (6–5 vs. San Francisco); they were led by coach Sharvey G. Umbeck to both titles. They were runners up in 1946 against USC. Individually, players have won two individual events: Gardner Larned won the singles title in 1947 and the pair of Fred Kovaleski and Bernard Bartzen won the doubles title in 1948. Since then, Tribe men's tennis has made four national championship appearances (with a record of 0–3): 1999, 2005, 2007, and 2015. Additionally, the men have won four CAA tennis championships: 1988, 1990, 2005, and 2015.

NCAA performances

Women 
The women's team, while never winning an NCAA title, has also been prolific. The team has made 22 appearances in the NCAA championships with a combined record of 21–20: 1989, 1990, 1991, 1992, 1995, 1996, 1997, 1998, 1999, 2000, 2002, 2003, 2004, 2005, 2006, 2007, 2008, 2011, 2013, 2016, and 2017. Furthermore, the women's team has won 25 conference titles: 1986, 1987, 1988, 1989, 1990, 1991, 1992, 1993, 1994, 1995, 1996, 1997, 1998, 1999, 2000, 2002, 2004, 2005, 2007, 2008, 2011, 2013, 2015, 2016, and 2017.

NCAA performances

Volleyball 

The women's indoor volleyball team competes at William & Mary Hall. They have won eight CAA championships (1985, 1986, 1987, 1988, 1989, 1990, 1991, and 2001) and made one appearance in the NCAA tournament in 2001 losing in the first round to Duke University.

NCAA Tournament performances

National championships

Team 
William & Mary has won two NCAA national team championships, both for men's tennis; the Tribe won back-to-back national championships in 1947 and 1948. During the era when the AIAW conducted women's collegiate championships, the Tribe women claimed one AIAW national team title, for golf (Division II) in 1981.

Notable alumni 
Main article: List of College of William & Mary alumni

Notable graduates from the athletic programs include Jon Stewart, Adin Brown, Sean McDermott, Mike Leach, Buster Ramsey, Darren Sharper, Mike Tomlin, Bill Chambers, J. D. Gibbs, Steve Christie, Wade Barrett, Jill Ellis, and Derek Cox.

Fight songs 

In addition to the most common Fight Song, the "William and Mary Victory March" (composed in the 1930s by Rolf Kennard) is occasionally heard before games. There is a long-running superstition that playing the Victory March during a game will lead to a bad result.

Radio affiliates 
Two radio stations in eastern Virginia broadcast Tribe football and men's basketball, under the branding "William & Mary Bookstore Tribe Radio Network".

See also 
List of NCAA college football rivalry games

Notes

References

External links